Central Footwear Training Centre, established in 1996,  is a government polytechnic located in Budge Budge,  South 24 Parganas district, West Bengal. This polytechnic is affiliated to the West Bengal State Council of Technical Education,  and recognised by AICTE, New Delhi. This polytechnic offers diploma courses in Footwear technology, and Leather Goods technology.

References

External links
 
 Admission to Polytechnics in West Bengal for Academic Session 2006-2007

Indian footwear
Technical universities and colleges in West Bengal
Universities and colleges in South 24 Parganas district
Educational institutions established in 1996
1996 establishments in West Bengal